Moss Station is a railway station located in downtown Moss in Østfold, Norway.
The station is located on the Østfold Line and serves as terminal station for Line 550 of the Oslo Commuter Rail service to Oslo Central Station and onwards to Spikkestad as well as a stop of the regional services to Halden. All services are operated by Vy.

History
Moss Station was built based upon designs by architect, Peter Andreas Blix. The station was opened as part of the railway on 2 January 1879.
In 1923, an agreement was made by which the restaurant was to be taken over by Norsk Spisevognselskap (NSS) in 1924. However, private operation continued until 1 October 1941, when operations were taken over by Spisevognselskapet.

New station
A new station is being built 300 meters south of the current station, connected to the construction of a high-speed line. Construction started 2019 and will be in operation 2025.

References

Railway stations in Østfold
Railway stations on the Østfold Line
Railway stations opened in 1879
1879 establishments in Norway
Moss, Norway